Michael Joseph "Mickey" Doolin (May 7, 1880 in Ashland, Pennsylvania – November 1, 1951 in Orlando, Florida), was a professional baseball player who played shortstop in the Major Leagues from 1905 to 1918. During his career, he played for the Philadelphia Phillies, Baltimore Terrapins, Chicago Whales, Chicago Cubs, New York Giants, and Brooklyn Robins. His name is often misspelled as "Doolan" due to many of his baseball cards being misspelled.

See also
List of Major League Baseball career stolen bases leaders

External links

1880 births
1951 deaths
Brooklyn Robins players
Baltimore Terrapins players
Philadelphia Phillies players
New York Giants (NL) players
Chicago Cubs players
Chicago Whales players
Major League Baseball shortstops
Baseball players from Pennsylvania
People from Ashland, Pennsylvania
Minor league baseball managers
Jersey City Skeeters players
Rochester Hustlers players
Reading Coal Barons players
Baltimore Orioles (IL) players
Chicago Cubs coaches
Cincinnati Reds coaches